Ian Sturmer (born 23 August 1991) is an English former cricketer. Sturmer played as a right-handed batsman who bowled right-arm medium pace.  He was born in Chiddingly, Sussex.

While studying for his degree in Information Management and Business Studies at Loughborough University, Sturmer made his first-class debut for Loughborough MCCU against Kent in 2011.  In this match, he bowled 7 wicket-less overs in Kent's only innings of the match.  With the bat, Sturmer scored 2 not out in Loughborough's first-innings, while in their second he was dismissed for 5 runs by Adam Riley.

References

External links

1991 births
Living people
People from Chiddingly
Alumni of Loughborough University
English cricketers
Loughborough MCCU cricketers